Carinomitra peculiaris is a species of sea snail, a marine gastropod mollusk in the family Mitridae, the miters or miter snails.

Description

Distribution
This marine species occurs off Papua New Guinea and the Philippines.

References

External links
 Reeve L.A. (1844-1845). Monograph of the genus Mitra. In: Conchologia Iconica, vol. 2, pl. 1-39 and unpaginated text. L. Reeve & Co., London
 Fedosov A., Puillandre N., Herrmann M., Kantor Yu., Oliverio M., Dgebuadze P., Modica M.V. & Bouchet P. (2018). The collapse of Mitra: molecular systematics and morphology of the Mitridae (Gastropoda: Neogastropoda). Zoological Journal of the Linnean Society. 183(2): 253-337

Mitridae
Gastropods described in 1845